Amar Shakti is a 1978 Hindi film produced and directed by Harmesh Malhotra. It stars Shashi Kapoor, Shatrughan Sinha, Sulakshana Pandit and Manjula in lead roles.

Cast
Shashi Kapoor as Chhota Kumar / Amar Singh
Shatrughan Sinha as Bada Kumar / Shakti Singh
Sulakshana Pandit as Rajkumari Sunita Singh
Manjula as  Chamki
Pradeep Kumar as Maharaj Shamsher Singh
Jeevan as Diwan Nahar Singh
Ranjeet as Sardar's Son
Om Shivpuri as Sardar
Birbal as Gopal
Indrani Mukherjee as Leela
Roopesh Kumar as Yuvraj Kumar Ranjit Narayan Singh
Rajan Haksar as Yuvraj Gopal Singh
Alka as Yuvrani Roopa G. Singh
Jankidas as Hakim
Ram Mohan as  Shakti's Friend
Murad as Maharaj
Mohan Sherry as Kotwal Sher Singh

Soundtrack
Lyrics: Anand Bakshi

External links
 

1978 films
1970s Hindi-language films
Films scored by Laxmikant–Pyarelal
Films directed by Harmesh Malhotra